The Khoja Mosque is a mosque in Nairobi, Kenya.

History
The mosque was built by the Isma'ilism community led by Aga Khan. The construction was completed on January 14, 1922. The building was then later declared a national monument by National Museums of Kenya.

Architecture
The mosque was constructed with Victorian architecture style. It is housed in a three-story building.

See also
 Islam in Kenya
 List of mosques in Kenya

References

1922 establishments in Kenya
Mosques in Kenya
Mosques completed in 1922
Religious buildings and structures in Nairobi